Brachyopa is a Holarctic genus of hoverflies whose grey and brown colouration is unusual for this family and these flies can easily be overlooked amongst members of other fly families. The larvae can be found under the bark of dead branches and trees in decaying sap.

Species

References

External links
 Images representing Brachyopa

Hoverfly genera
Eristalinae
Taxa named by Johann Wilhelm Meigen
Diptera of Asia
Diptera of Europe
Diptera of North America
Diptera of Africa